The Alajõgi is a river in Estonia. The river is 29 km long. The river begins at Kõnnu Pikkjärv, near the village of Ongassaare.

Rivers of Estonia
Landforms of Ida-Viru County